Jourian is a town and a notified area committee in Jammu district in the Indian administered union territory of Jammu and Kashmir.

Geography
It has an average elevation of 274 metres (899 feet).

Demographics

 India census, Jourian had a population of 3628. Males constitute 51% of the population and females 49%. Jourian has an average literacy rate of 75%, higher than the national average of 59.5%: male literacy is 81%, and female literacy is 68%. In Jourian, 12% of the population is under 6 years of age.

In the 2011 census 97.20% of residents were Hindu, 0.69% were Sikh and 0.81% were Muslim.

References

Cities and towns in Jammu district